The Toreador Song, also known as the Toreador March, is the popular name for the aria "" ("I toast you"), from the French opera Carmen, composed by Georges Bizet to a libretto by Henri Meilhac and Ludovic Halévy. It is sung by the bullfighter (French: toréador) Escamillo as he enters in act 2 and describes various situations in the bullring, the cheering of the crowds and the fame that comes with victory. The refrain, "", forms the middle part of the prelude to act 1 of Carmen.

Music

The bass-baritone couplet has a vocal range from B2 to F4 and a tessitura from C3 to E4. Its time signature is common time (4/4), its key is F minor with the refrain in F major. The tempo indication is allegro molto moderato, =108.

The orchestra introduces the first melodic section, which is jaunty and flashy. Like Carmen's Habanera, it is built on a descending chromatic scale as Escamillo describes his experiences in the bullfighting ring. In the chorus praising the toreador, the music turns celebratory and confident in character.

Frasquita, Mercédès, Carmen, Moralès, Zuniga and the chorus join for the repeat of the refrain.

Libretto

Votre toast, je peux vous le rendre,
Señors, señors car avec les soldats
oui, les toréros, peuvent s'entendre;
Pour plaisirs, pour plaisirs,
ils ont les combats!

Le cirque est plein, c'est jour de fête!
Le cirque est plein du haut en bas;
Les spectateurs, perdant la tête,
Les spectateurs s'interpellent
À grand fracas!

Apostrophes, cris et tapage
Poussés jusques à la fureur!
Car c'est la fête du courage!
C'est la fête des gens de cœur!
Allons! en garde!
Allons! allons! Ah!

(Refrain ×2)
Toréador, en garde! Toréador!
Toréador!
Et songe bien, oui,
songe en combattant
Qu'un œil noir te regarde,
Et que l'amour t'attend,
Toréador, l'amour, l'amour t'attend!

Tout d'un coup, on fait silence,
On fait silence... ah! que se passe-t-il?
Plus de cris, c'est l'instant!
Plus de cris, c'est l'instant!

Le taureau s'élance
en bondissant hors du toril!
Il s'élance! Il entre, il frappe!...
un cheval roule,
entraînant un picador,
"Ah! Bravo! Toro!" hurle la foule,
le taureau va... il vient...
il vient et frappe encore!

En secouant ses banderilles,
plein de fureur, il court!
Le cirque est plein de sang!
On se sauve... on franchit les grilles!
C'est ton tour maintenant!
Allons! en garde! allons! allons! Ah!

(Refrain ×2)

L'amour! L'amour! L'amour!
Toréador, Toréador, Toreador!
I toast you,
Señores, Señores, because with soldiers
yes, toreros can get along;
For the pleasures, for the pleasure
they fight!

The circus is full, it is a celebrating day!
The circus is full from top to bottom;
The crowd goes mad,
the crowd is arguing
with great deal!

Apostrophes, shouts and noises
Push to the breaking point!
Because it is the celebration of courage!
It is the celebration of the braves of heart!
Let's go! On guard! Let's go!
Let's go! Let's go! Ah!

(Refrain ×2)
Toreador, on guard! Toreador!
Toreador!
And contemplate well, yes contemplate
as you fight
that a dark eye is watching you,
and that love is waiting for you,
Toreador, love, love is waiting for you!

All at once, we are silent,
we are silent,... Oh, what is happening?
No more shouts, this is it!
No more shouts, this is it!

The bull is rushing
while jumping out of its fence!
He is rushing in! He's entering, hitting!
A horse is falling,
Dragging down a picador.
"Ah! Bravo! Toro!" the crowd is calling,
The bull goes on... he comes...
he comes, hitting once more!

While shaking his banderillas ,
full of rage, he runs!...
the circus is full of blood!
We flee... we pass the gates!
It's your turn now!
Let's go! On guard! Let's go! Let's go! Ah!

(Refrain ×2)

Love! Love! Love!
Toreador, Toreador, Toreador!

Legacy

Stan' up and Fight 
The English language version of the song, Stan''' (or Stand) up and Fight, written by Oscar Hammerstein II for Carmen Jones, has long been associated with Munster Rugby, and an adapted version, Geelong Cats: We Are Geelong, has been used by the Geelong Cats Australian Football League team.

 In other media 
Usage and renditions of the Toreador Song have appeared in various forms of media, such as when the song was performed by Samuel Ramey on Sesame Street, who rewrote the lyrics to be about the letter L, or in an episode of Doctor Who. The Toreador Song is also used in the 2014 video game Five Nights at Freddy's'', where the song plays as the theme of the titular antagonist upon the player running out of power in-game, and as such, the Toreador Song has occasionally been marketed as Freddy's theme.

A piece of the Toreador Song's sheet music, with lyrics translated to English by Jerry Castillo, is owned by the Smithsonian Institution and kept in the National Museum of American History.

Formula One uses this as the podium music.

References

External links
, Opera Company of Philadelphia at Reading Terminal Market in 2011
 French text and English translation

Arias by Georges Bizet
Carmen
Opera excerpts
Baritone arias
Arias in French
1875 compositions
Songs about sportspeople
Songs about cattle
Songs about Spain
Compositions in F minor
Compositions in F major
Bullfighting